Alcibiades the Schoolboy (L'Alcibiade, fanciullo a scola), an Italian dialogue published anonymously in 1652, is a defense of homosexual sodomy (anal sex) loosely styled after Socratic dialogue. Set in ancient Athens, the teacher is modelled on Socrates, who so desperately wants to consummate the relationship he has with Alcibiades, one of his students, that he uses all tactics of rhetoric and sophistry at his disposal. He argues that Nature gave us sexual organs for our own pleasure, and that it would insult her to use them otherwise, citing examples from Greek mythology and culture, as well as refuting counterarguments based on the Sodom and Gomorrah story. It is "a tour de force of pederastic fantasy and one of the frankest and most explicit texts on the subject to have been written before the twentieth century." It has been called "the first homosexual novel".

For many years the identity of the author was a mystery. The work was first attributed to Pietro Aretino, but an article in 1888 by Achille Neri identified the author as Antonio Rocco, a libertine priest and philosopher and member of the Accademia degli Incogniti founded by Giovan Battista Loredan.

The text is unashamedly explicit, and it has been argued that "it must be understood in the context of similar texts of the trend of libertinism, using the term in its original sense of a sceptical philosophical tendency."


References

Sources

Text and translations

English
 Translation into English by Laura T. de Summa The Philosophical Forum, volume 42, issue 4, 2011, pp. 497–506.
 Translation into English by J. C. Rawnsley with an afterword by Don Mader, Amsterdam: Entimos Press, 2000.

French
 Gustave Brunet, Dissertation sur L'Alcibiade fanciullo a scola, including French translation by Giovanni Battista Baseggio. Facsimile reprint available as book-on-demand from Kessinger, 2010 .
 Unsigned "Preface to the 1891 French edition", http://www.williamapercy.com/wiki/images/Alchibiades_Preface.pdf, retrieved 2014-09-01. The preface is signed "Brussels, 1891", so the "1891 French edition" is apparently that published with the imprint (very possibly false) of Brussels. Many notes prefixed "JCR" (J. C. Rawnsley), including n. 2, which says "at the time of writing (July, 2000)".

Secondary material
 
 Giovanni Dall'Orto, "Antonio Rocco and the Background of His 'L'Alcibiade fanciullo a Scola' (1652)," Among Men, Among Women, Amsterdam:  University, 1983, pp. 224–32.
 Diederik Janssen, "Alcibiades the Schoolboy Redux, or the Impossibility of Childhood Sexuality", International Journal of Sexual Health, 23, no. 3 2011, pp. 158–160.

1652 books
Dialogues
Gay fiction
Pederastic literature
Works published anonymously
17th century in LGBT history
LGBT erotica
Cultural depictions of Socrates